Vindhuja Vikraman (born 01 August 1993) is an Indian television actress who appears in Malayalam and Tamil language soap operas.

Career
Vindhuja was born 01 August 1993 to Vikraman Nair and Bindhu. She has a younger brother. She started her TV career with the comedy show, Back Benchers (2015). After that, she played supporting roles in Parasparam, Kaligandaki and Athmasakhi. In 2017, she played the lead role in soap opera Chandanamazha replacing Meghna Vincent. She then ventured into Tamil language serials through a leading role in Ponnukku Thanga Manasu. She returned to Malayalam through Oridathoru Rajakumari. She is currently playing the lead role in Kana Kanmani.

Filmography

Television

Special appearances

Films

Music videos

References

External links
 

Living people
Malayali people
Actresses from Kerala
Indian soap opera actresses
21st-century Indian actresses
Actresses in Malayalam television
Actresses in Tamil television
Actresses in Telugu television
Actresses in Malayalam cinema
1993 births